Parinari nonda is a shrub or small tree in the family Chrysobalanaceae. It occurs in northern Australia and New Guinea. The edible fruits are harvested in the wild. Common names include nonda plum, nonda tree, nunda plum  and parinari.

References

nonda
Bushfood
Malpighiales of Australia
Flora of New Guinea
Flora of the Northern Territory
Flora of Queensland
Rosids of Western Australia